Fascination may refer to:

Music
"Fascination", a stride piano composition by James P. Johnson recorded in 1917 (as a piano roll) and 1939 (acoustic)
Fascination!, a 1983 album by The Human League
"(Keep Feeling) Fascination", a 1983 song in The Human League album Fascination!
Fascination (album), a 2009 album released by The Greencards
Fascination, a 2022 album released by The Birthday Massacre
"Fascination" (David Bowie song), 1975
"Fascination" (Alphabeat song), 2006
Fascination (1905 song), a 1905 song used in several films and recorded many times
"Fascination" (Donna Summer song), 1987
Fascination Records, part of the Polydor record label
"Fascination (Eternal Love Mix)", a song from the music video game Dance Dance Revolution SuperNova

Entertainment
Fascination (1931 film), a British film directed by Miles Mander
Fascination (1979 film), a 1979 film directed by Jean Rollin
Fascination (1922 film), a 1922 silent film starring Mae Murray
Fascination (2004 film), a movie starring James Naughton and Jacqueline Bisset
Fascinación, a 1949 Argentine film
"Fascination" (Star Trek: Deep Space Nine), a 1994 third-season episode of Star Trek: Deep Space Nine
Fascination (game), a game commonly found in amusement parks
Fascination (video game), a 1991 video game by Coktel Vision
Fascination, a 2004 collection of short stories by William Boyd

Other uses
Fascination (short story collection), a 2004 short story collection by the William Boyd
MS Fascination, the fourth ship in Carnival Cruise Lines' Fantasy class of mega-cruise ships
Fascination, an automobile prototype developed by Paul M. Lewis

See also
Fascinación, a 1949 film by Carlos Schlieper 
Fasciinatiion, 2008 album by dance-punk band The Faint
Fascinate, a graffiti painting in Bromsten, Stockholm
Fascinated (disambiguation)
Fascinus, the embodiment of the divine phallus in ancient Roman religion and magic
Fasciation, abnormal plant growth